Jahméne Aaron Douglas (born 26 February 1991) is a British soul/gospel singer who records under the mononym Jahméne. He was the runner-up to James Arthur on the ninth series of The X Factor in 2012.

In December 2012, he signed a record deal with Sony Music. In July 2013, he released his debut studio album, Love Never Fails, which peaked at number one on the UK Albums Chart and included appearances from Nicole Scherzinger, in a duet of "The Greatest Love of All", and Stevie Wonder, who lent his harmonica skills on "Give Us This Day". In September 2014, Jahméne signed his second deal with Independent Label Moonshot Music and released his second album, Unfathomable Phantasmagoria, in September 2016.

Career

2012: The X Factor

On 30 May 2012, Douglas auditioned in London for the ninth series of The X Factor. He sang Etta James' "At Last" with a powerful voice in what Louis had stated as a "revelation" and received four yeses from judges Louis Walsh, Tulisa, Gary Barlow and Nicole Scherzinger. Douglas managed to advance to judges' houses, where he impressed mentor Nicole Scherzinger with his rendition of David Guetta's "Titanium", thereby making it to the live shows. He fought his way through to the finals with James Arthur and Christopher Maloney. On 8 December, he was the first act to make it safely through to the second night of the live finals, along with Arthur.  He finished the competition in second place.

2013: Love Never Fails and X Factor Around the World

On 19 December 2012, it was announced that Douglas had signed a record deal with Sony Music. On 25 January 2013, it was confirmed that he had signed with RCA Records and would be releasing his debut album in May.

It was announced by RCA Records that Douglas' first album would be called Love Never Fails and would be released on 22 July. It debuted at number one in the UK. Douglas also donated all of his profits from the single "Titanium" to the domestic abuse campaigns of the charity Women's Aid. The album features appearances from his X Factor mentor Scherzinger and Stevie Wonder. He released a single from the album, a cover of David Guetta's "Titanium", onto his Vevo account on 12 June 2013.

In August 2013, Douglas performed in Indonesia for RCTI's 24th anniversary television special, X Factor Around the World, along with Samantha Jade, The Collective, Melanie Amaro, Novita Dewi and Fatin Shidqia. "Titanium" subsequently hit number 1 the following day in Indonesia.

2016: Unfathomable Phantasmagoria

The album, Unfathomable Phantasmagoria, was released on 23 September 2016. This album features 16 tracks with Jahméne also writing several tracks. Samuel L. Jackson lent his voice to the project. Jahméne met Jackson in 2012 when he invited Jahméne to sing at a charity ball he was hosting. He lends his voice to the intro of the album opening the record with the Bible verse 1 Corinthians 13:4–8. Jackson then goes on to read from, Galatians 5:22-23 as an interlude on the album, which also features in the lead single's video, "Is This the Time?" Jahméne then went on to release "I Wish" from the album as the anthem for the charity Peace One Day. The song was written by Diane Warren.

The album consists of his signature sound, including soul, R&B and gospel. Notable writers other than Diane Warren include Andrea Martin, Stanley Brown (Shirley Caesar, Hezekiah Walker, Karen Clark Sheard), Sacha Skarbek, Electric (Little Mix, Rihanna, The Wanted) and Jim Beanz (Timbaland, Chris Brown, Dru Hill).

Jahméne stated that he had more control over the process of making the album in comparison to his first, from the sound, to his songwriting, down to the artwork and title. The sleeve inside the physical copy even includes one of Jahméne's poems entitled "Shadow Serpent".

Track listing

Personal life
Jahméne Douglas was born in Birmingham in 1991 to Mandy Thomas and Eustace Douglas. He is of mixed heritage which includes English, St. Kitts (Caribbean) and Welsh. He is the first youth ambassador of the UK charity Women's Aid, for children and young people. Before rising to fame when he appeared on The XFactor, he worked in an Asda supermarket in Swindon.

Jahméne is of Christian faith and speaks openly about how that has pulled him through many dark places. His debut album's title, Love Never Fails, is taken from the scripture 1 Corinthians 13, one of his favourite passages in the Bible. The idea of the album was to have spiritual twists on the chosen covers. Jahméne has been seen exercising his faith in public. He refused to sing "Last Friday Night (T.G.I.F.)" by Katy Perry, for an X Factor group ensemble performance, because of its graphic/unsuitable lyrical content. He opined that Ella Henderson, 16 at the time, should not be made to sing the song and that lyrically it was not suitable for the family show.

Awards
Jahmene Douglas was nominated for Best Newcomer at the MOBO Awards in 2013 and performed "Next to Me". Douglas also received a nomination and subsequently won Best Male Newcomer at the Urban Music Awards.

Discography

Albums

Extended plays

Singles

References

External links

1991 births
Living people
British gospel singers
English pop singers
English soul singers
English male singer-songwriters
English Christians
People from Swindon
Musicians from Wiltshire
RCA Records artists
The X Factor (British TV series) contestants
English people of Saint Kitts and Nevis descent
English people of Welsh descent
21st-century English singers
21st-century British male singers